A Cinderella Story is a 2004 American teen romantic comedy film directed by Mark Rosman, written by Leigh Dunlap and starring Hilary Duff, Chad Michael Murray, Jennifer Coolidge, and Regina King. A modernization of the classic Cinderella folklore, the film's plot revolves around two internet pen pals who plan to meet in person at their high school's Halloween dance.

The film was released on July 16, 2004. While it received negative reviews from critics, the film was a box office success, grossing $70 million against its $19 million budget, and inspired multiple straight-to-video sequels. Over the years, it has developed into a cult classic.

Plot
Samantha "Sam" Montgomery is raised by her father Hal, who runs a diner in the San Fernando Valley. Hal dies in the 1994 Northridge earthquake apparently without leaving a will, leading Sam's vain and greedy stepmother Fiona to inherit everything. Eight years later, 17-year-old Sam is tormented by Fiona and her twin daughters Brianna and Gabriella, while the community faces a drought. Sam and her best friend Carter, an aspiring actor, are bullied by the popular clique at school, led by head cheerleader Shelby. Forced to work at the diner to save money to attend Princeton, Sam is looked after by longtime manager Rhonda, and confides in her online pen pal "Nomad", who shares her dream to attend Princeton to become a writer. Unbeknownst to Sam, "Nomad" is Austin Ames, the popular but unhappy school quarterback and Shelby’s boyfriend, whose father expects him to attend the University of Southern California.

Sam agrees to meet "Nomad" at the school Halloween dance, and Austin breaks up with Shelby. Fiona refuses to give Sam the night off to attend the dance, but Rhonda and Carter intervene, and Rhonda gives Sam a mask and wedding dress to wear as "Cinderella". Dressed as "Prince Charming", Austin reveals to Sam that he is "Nomad" but does not recognize her under her mask, and they share a romantic dance. A masked Carter makes out with Shelby after defending her from the unwanted advances of Austin’s friend, but is forced to drive Sam back to the diner before Fiona discovers she is gone. As they leave, Sam drops her cell phone, which is found by Austin, as he and the missing Cinderella are named homecoming prince and princess. The diner staff stall Fiona and her daughters, and Sam arrives just in time, thankfully avoiding having Fiona come into the kitchen to confront her as she was still wearing the dress under her normal clothes.

The next day, Austin covers the school in flyers, hoping to identify the mysterious Cinderella, and Carter is cruelly rejected by Shelby. Austin’s friends present him with a crowd of girls claiming to be Cinderella, without success. He is accepted to Princeton but unable to tell his father, and visits the diner, where Sam tries to tell him the truth. Brianna and Gabriella discover Sam’s emails with Austin, realizing she is the mystery homecoming princess. After failing to convince Austin that they are each Cinderella, the twins present the emails to Shelby, convincing her that Sam schemed to steal Austin away from her. At the school pep rally, Shelby and the twins perform a humiliating skit exposing Sam as Cinderella, and she goes home in tears.

Having intercepted Sam’s acceptance letter from Princeton, Fiona forges a rejection letter and feigns sympathy, telling Sam she has a job at the diner for life. Rhonda encourages Sam not to lose hope, and her stepsisters inadvertently uncover a wallpapered-over mural of Hal’s motto. Inspired, Sam finally stands up to Fiona and quits the diner, leading Rhonda, the rest of the staff, and even the customers to leave as well. Moving in with Rhonda, Sam confronts Austin for being afraid to show who he really is, just before the homecoming game. Seeing her leaving before the final play of the game, Austin stands up to his father and runs after Sam. He apologizes, and they share their first kiss in the rain as the drought suddenly ends.

Sam finds her father’s will hidden in her childhood book of fairy tales, revealing that everything was left to her, including the diner. As the rightful owner, Sam is able to sell her stepfamily’s belongings to pay for college, while Fiona claims to have never seen the will before, despite having signed it as a witness. Arrested for fraud and violating California child labor laws by the LAPD and D.A., she is forced to work off her debt at the diner, now co-owned by Rhonda, and is joined by her daughters, who retrieve Sam's acceptance letter from the trash. Carter lands a commercial, and rejects Shelby for Astrid, the school’s goth DJ and announcer. Austin returns Sam’s cell phone, and they begin a relationship, driving off to Princeton together.

Cast

Production
Clifford Werber conceived a modernized adaptation of the Cinderella story due to its long-lasting appeal of being "the ultimate wish-fulfillment fantasy" with "an underlying message of empowerment."

Release
A Cinderella Story premiered at Grauman's Chinese Theatre on July 10, 2004. It premiered in theaters with competition from other products that starred princesses or were fantasy-themed, such as The Prince & Me (2004), Ella Enchanted (2004) and The Princess Diaries 2: Royal Engagement (2004).

Reception

Critical response 
On Rotten Tomatoes, the film holds an approval rating of 12% based on 104 reviews, with an average rating of 3.6/10. The website's critical consensus reads, "An uninspired, generic updating of the classic fairy tale." On Metacritic, the film has a weighted average score on 25 out of 100, based on 30 critics, indicating "generally unfavorable reviews". Audiences polled by CinemaScore gave the film an average grade of "A−" on an A+ to F scale.

Roger Ebert wrote that A Cinderella Story "is a lame, stupid movie, but Warner Bros. is spending a fortune to persuade [young audiences] to see it and recommend it". Other critics panned the plot as "simple, lazy storytelling" and "a dull rehash of the old girl-meets-boy chestnut". They noted that its attempts to modernize aspects of the source material were gimmicky and led to illogical plot elements, such as a cell phone being the film's glass slipper and Sam looking too pretty and cheerful for an outcast. Some particularly felt the use of a perfect teenager as a social reject delegitimized the moral of any average person believing in oneself.

The film was nominated for five Teen Choice Awards at the 2005 ceremony, winning the award for Choice Movie Blush Scene, the same year Duff won the Kids Choice Awards for Favorite Movie Actress.

Box office
In its opening weekend, the film grossed $13,623,350 in 2,625 theaters in the United States and Canada, ranking #4 at the box office, behind I, Robot, Spider-Man 2 and Anchorman: The Legend of Ron Burgundy. By the end of its run, A Cinderella Story grossed $51,438,175 domestically and $18,629,734 internationally, totaling $70,067,909 worldwide.

Accolades

The film won and was nominated for a number of awards throughout 2004–2005.

Soundtrack

Sequels

A Cinderella Story was followed by five direct-to-video sequels, each presenting a separate modern-day version of the Cinderella story: The sequels use the themes and situations that also borrow from the Cinderella tale, but do not contain any characters from the first film. Unlike the first film, the sequels also include musical, dance and holiday event themes.

References

External links

 
 
 
 
 
 
 
 

A Cinderella Story (film series)
2004 films
2004 romantic comedy films
2000s American films
2000s English-language films
2000s high school films
2000s teen comedy films
2000s teen romance films
American high school films
American romantic comedy films
American teen comedy films
American teen romance films
Films based on Charles Perrault's Cinderella
Films directed by Mark Rosman
Films scored by Christophe Beck
Films set in 1994
Films set in 2002
Films set in the San Fernando Valley
Films shot in Los Angeles
Warner Bros. films